Institutions of learning called Simmons College or Simmons University include:

 Simmons University, a women's liberal arts college in Boston, Massachusetts
 Simmons College of Kentucky, a historically black college in Louisville, Kentucky
 Hardin–Simmons University, in Abilene, Texas